All or Nothing is the fourth studio album by British post-punk band Shopping. It was released on 7 February 2020 through FatCat Records.

Stylistically All or Nothing has been described by contemporary critics as an expansion of the band's sound while repurposing their traditional post-punk sound. Critics have noted that tracks on the album touch on a range of genres including disco, dark wave, krautrock, and synth-pop. The album garnered critical acclaim based on music aggregate ratings.

Critical reception 

All or Nothing was well received by contemporary music critics. On review aggregator, Metacritic, All or Nothing has an average rating of 78 out of 100 based on twelve critic reviews, indicating "generally favorable".

Track listing
 "All or Nothing" – 3:15
 "Initiative" – 2:48
 "Follow Me" – 3:07
 "No Apologies" – 2:49
 "For Your Pleasure" – 3:31
 "About You" – 3:50
 "Lies" – 2:59
 "Expert Advice" – 2:57
 "Body Clock" – 2:21
 "Trust in Us" – 2:55

See also
List of 2020 albums

References

External links 
 All or Nothing at FatCat Records

2020 albums
Shopping (band) albums
FatCat Records albums
Dark wave albums
Disco albums by English artists
Dance-punk albums
Funk rock albums by English artists
Synth-pop albums by English artists